How to Talk Australians is an eight-part online miniseries released in 2014. The series looks at Australian culture and language through the eyes of the teachers and students of the fictional Delhi College of Linguistics.

Synopsis
At the Delhi College of Linguistics in India, students of linguistics and aspiring migrants to Australia are taught about elements of Australian culture such as Australian lingo, rhyming slang, grub, local celebrities, how to 'chuck a sickie', and how to pass the citizenship test. The show features a foul-mouthed cockatoo known as Chopper, an impersonation of Pauline Hanson, and a re-enactment of a Ned Kelly hold-up.

Production
The series was originally created as a television pilot that was to be pitched to Australian television networks; however, Screen Australia’s Multiplatform Drama Production program, aiming to support and increase online storytelling, provided funds for it to be presented as an online series.

When asked why the concept for the show was chosen, producer Jason Byrne stated:

Episodes

Cast
 Vishal Kotak
 Jeffrey Dsouza
 Chum Ehelepola
 Robert Santiago
 Vikrant Narain
 Sybil Quadros
 Ananth Gopal
 Kamla Chandar

See also

 They're a Weird Mob

References

External links
How to Talk Australians Facebook Page

Australian comedy web series
2014 web series debuts
2014 web series endings
Viral videos
2010s YouTube series
Fictional schools
Australian English